Ihalainen is a Finnish surname. Notable people with the surname include:

 Lauri Ihalainen (born 1947), Finnish trade union leader and politician
 J. K. Ihalainen (born 1957), Finnish poet
 Marianne Ihalainen (born 1967), Finnish ice hockey player

Finnish-language surnames